The Lansing Lugnuts are a Minor League Baseball team of the Midwest League and the High-A affiliate of the Oakland Athletics. They are located in Lansing, Michigan, and play their home games at Jackson Field.

The Midwest League came to Lansing after owners Tom Dickson and Sherrie Myers moved the team to work with the city for a public-private lease to build a new stadium. Mayor David Hollister, and the City Council worked to attract the owners and build the stadium for downtown economic development. The team began playing in downtown Lansing in 1996. The franchise began as the Lafayette Red Sox in Lafayette, Indiana, in 1955; after two seasons it became the Waterloo Hawks, moving to Waterloo, Iowa, where it stayed for 36 seasons. Before the 1994 season it moved to Springfield, Illinois, but only spent two seasons there before moving to Lansing. The franchise was an affiliate of the Kansas City Royals on two occasions in three cities: as the Waterloo Royals from 1969 through 1976, as the Sultans of Springfield in 1995, and then, upon the team's move to Lansing, from 1996 through 1998. The Lugnuts were then an affiliate of the Chicago Cubs from 1999 through 2004 before joining the Jays' farm system for the 2005 season. In September 2014, the Jays extended their agreement with the Lugnuts through the 2016 season. In October 2016, their player development contract was extended through the 2018 season. Since 2021, they have been be the High-A affiliate of the Oakland Athletics.

The Lugnuts' ballpark, Jackson Field, opened in 1996. The stadium seats over 10,000 fans and is one of the most handicapped accessible stadiums in the country. The franchise attendance record of 538,326 was set during its inaugural year. They won the Midwest League Championship in 1997 and 2003. The Lugnuts have their own original song which plays immediately after the national anthem for every home game accompanied by their mascot, Big Lug.

Crosstown Showdown
Since 2007, the Lansing Lugnuts have participated in an annual exhibition game with nearby Michigan State University which draws a large crowd of students to the event. The overall record and attendance for each game is as follows:

Playoffs

Media coverage
Jesse Goldberg-Strassler broadcasts Lugnuts home and away games on WVFN-AM.  WVFN previously aired Lugnuts games from 2001 to 2003.

Lugnuts games also aired on WJIM-AM from 1996 to 2000 and WQTX-FM from 2004 to 2016. Several games per season aired on WLNS-TV from 1996 through 2001. From 2002 to 2009, one game aired each season on WILX-TV.

Alumni
The following are players in Major League Baseball who played, at one time, for the Lugnuts. This partial list includes players making injury-comeback starts as well as those that developed in Lansing.

Kansas City Royals

 Jeremy Affeldt
 Kevin Appier
 Carlos Beltrán
 Juan Brito
 Lance Carter
 Tim Collins
 Chad Durbin
 Carlos Febles
 Jeremy Giambi
 Mark Quinn
 José Santiago
 Andy Sisco

 Orber Moreno

Chicago Cubs

 Francis Beltrán
 Ronny Cedeño
 Rocky Cherry
 Robinson Chirinos
 Hee-seop Choi
 Juan Cruz
 Ryan Dempster
 Jake Fox
 Adam Greenberg
 Ángel Guzmán
 Rich Hill
 Jon Leicester
 Carlos Mármol
 Sean Marshall
 Juan Mateo
 Adalberto Méndez
 Sergio Mitre
 Orber Moreno
 Corey Patterson
 Billy Petrick
 Félix Pie
 Andy Pratt
 Mark Prior
 Clay Rapada
 Ryan Theriot
 Jermaine Van Buren
 Todd Wellemeyer
 Randy Wells
 Carlos Zambrano

Toronto Blue Jays

 Anthony Alford
 Henderson Álvarez
 Danny Barnes
 Chad Beck
 Jon Berti
 Bo Bichette
 Cavan Biggio
 Ryan Borucki
 Joel Carreño
 Miguel Castro
 Taylor Cole
 David Cooper
 Evan Crawford
 Jonathan Davis
 Matt Dermody
 Danny Farquhar
 José Fernández
 Graham Godfrey
 Ryan Goins
 Yan Gomes
 Kendall Graveman
 Vladimir Guerrero Jr.
 Adeiny Hechavarria
 Drew Hutchison
 Casey Janssen
 Danny Jansen
 Brett Lawrie
 Jesse Litsch
 Aaron Loup
 Trystan Magnuson
 Darin Mastroianni
 Tim Mayza
 Deck McGuire
 Brad Mills
 Daniel Norris
 Roberto Osuna
 Tyler Pastornicky
 Luis Perez
 Kevin Pillar
 Dalton Pompey
 Carlos Ramírez
 Sean Reid-Foley
 Jordan Romano
 Marc Rzepczynski
 Aaron Sanchez
 Anthony Sanders
 Justin Shafer
 Dwight Smith Jr.
 Travis Snider
 Marcus Stroman
 Noah Syndergaard
 Rowdy Tellez
 Ryan Tepera
 Curtis Thigpen
 Richard Ureña

Miami Marlins

 Anthony DeSclafani
 Jake Fishman
 Adam Greenberg
 Jake Marisnick
 Justin Nicolino
 Renyel Pinto
 Matt Treanor

St. Louis Cardinals
 Kiko Calero

San Francisco Giants
 Eugenio Vélez

Roster

References
Notes

Sources

 
 Roth, Bob. Our Lugnuts, Year One. 1996. 
 Lansing Lugnuts Official Website

External links

 Official website
 Lugnuts page at the Lansing State Journal
 Broadcaster's Blog of Jesse Goldberg-Strassler

Baseball teams established in 1996
Midwest League teams
Sports in Lansing, Michigan
Professional baseball teams in Michigan
Chicago Cubs minor league affiliates
Kansas City Royals minor league affiliates
Oakland Athletics minor league affiliates
Toronto Blue Jays minor league affiliates
1996 establishments in Michigan
High-A Central teams